The 2011–12 Kazakhstan Hockey Championship was the 20th season of the Kazakhstan Hockey Championship, the top level of ice hockey in Kazakhstan. 10 teams participated in the league, and Beibarys Atyrau won the championship.

Regular season

Playoffs

External links
 Official website

Kazakhstan Hockey Championship
Kazakhstan Hockey Championship seasons
1